Bethan Roe (born 3 November 1999) is an English professional footballer who plays as a  defender for FA Women's Championship club Charlton Athletic. She started her career at her hometown club Norwich City where she rose through their youth ranks before moving to Albion.   She initially featured for Brighton & Hove Albion's academy side in partnership with Worthing College.

Career statistics 
As of 27 January 2021

References

External links

1999 births
Living people
Brighton & Hove Albion W.F.C. players
Women's Super League players
Women's association football midfielders
Women's association football defenders
English women's footballers
Charlton Athletic W.F.C. players
Women's Championship (England) players